The Samsung Galaxy Tab 3 8.0 is an 8-inch Android-based tablet computer produced and marketed by Samsung Electronics. It belongs to the third generation of the Samsung Galaxy Tab series, which also includes a 7-inch and a 10.1-inch model, the Galaxy Tab 3 7.0 and Galaxy Tab 3 10.1. It was launched in the US in July 2013. Unlike the 7-inch and 10.1 inch tablets, the Galaxy Tab 3 8.0 is a new size category of tablet in the Tab series and making its debut at this generation of Galaxy Tablets.

History 
The Galaxy Tab 3 8.0 was announced on 24 June 2013. It was shown along with the Galaxy Tab 3 7.0 and Galaxy Tab 3 10.1 at the 2013 Mobile World Conference. Samsung confirmed that the Galaxy Tab 3 8.0 would be released in the US on 7 July 2013 with a price of $299.99 for the 16 GB model.

Features
The Galaxy Tab 3 8.0 is released with Android 4.2.2 Jelly Bean. It was expected as of the Summer 2013 release that an upgrade to Android 4.3 Jelly Bean would be made available in the future; as of early 2014, the most recent news shows 4.3 being skipped with an upgrade to Android 4.4 KitKat coming sometime in 2014. Samsung has customized the interface with its TouchWiz UX software. As well as apps from Google, including Google Play, Gmail and YouTube, it has access to Samsung apps such as ChatON, S Suggest, S Voice, S Translator, S Planner, Smart Remote (Peel), Smart Stay, Multi-Window, Group Play, and All Share Play.

The Galaxy Tab 3 8.0 is available in WiFi-only, 3G & Wi-Fi, and 4G/LTE & Wi-Fi variants. Storage ranges from 16 GB to 32 GB depending on the model, with a microSDXC card slot for expansion. It has an 8-inch WXGA Super Clear LCD screen with a resolution of 1280x800 pixels. It also features a 1.3 MP front camera without flash and 5.0 MP AF rear-facing camera. It also has the ability to record HD videos.

See also

 Samsung Galaxy Tab series
 Samsung Electronics
 Samsung Galaxy Tab 3 7.0
 Samsung Galaxy Tab 3 10.1
 Samsung Galaxy Note 8.0

References

External links
 

Samsung Galaxy Tab series
Android (operating system) devices
Tablet computers introduced in 2013
Tablet computers